Niamh (from  Old Irish ) is an Irish feminine given name (meaning "bright" or "radiant"), anglicised as Neve, Nieve, Neave, Neavh or Neeve.

In Irish mythology, Niamh is the daughter of the god of the sea, Manannán mac Lir and one of the queens of Tír na nÓg, the land of eternal youth. She was the lover of the poet-hero Oisín. The first recorded use of Niamh (that spelling) as a given name in modern Ireland was in 1911, when two children were registered with the name and when a Niamh was listed in that year's census.

Neve is also a Dutch and Flemish surname, but 71% of persons named Niamh live in Ireland.

People with the given name

Niamh
Niamh Algar (born 1992), Irish actress
Niamh Blackshaw (born 1999), English actress
Niamh Briggs (born 1984), captain of Ireland's women's rugby team, 2015 Six Nations Champions
Niamh Bhreathnach (born 1945), Irish Minister for Education, 1993–97
Niamh Charles (born 1999), English footballer
Niamh Cosgrave (born 1964), Irish politician
Niamh Coyle, camogie player
Niamh Cusack (born 1959), Irish actress, daughter of Cyril Cusack
Niamh Fahey (born 1987), Irish footballer
Niamh Houston (born 1991), Northern Irish musician
Niamh Kavanagh (born 1968), Irish singer and 1993 winner of the Eurovision Song Contest
Niamh Kelly (born 1995), Gaelic football player and Australian rules player  
Niamh Kilkenny, Irish camogie player
Niamh Kindlon (born 1981), Irish Gaelic footballer
Niamh McCarthy (born 1994), Irish Paralympic discus thrower
Niamh McGrady (born 1983), Northern Irish actress
Niamh McGrath, camogie player
Niamh Mulcahy, camogie player
Niamh Ní Charra, Irish fiddler, concertina player and singer
Niamh Nic Daéid, Irish forensic scientist
Niamh O’Connor, writer, journalist and novelist
Niamh Parsons, traditional Irish singer
Niamh Perry (born 1990), Irish singer and actress
Niamh Marie Redmond, Miss Ireland 1996
Niamh Reid Burke (born 1991), Irish footballer
Niamh Rippin (born 1994), British artistic gymnast
Niamh Sharkey Irish children's author
Niamh Smyth (born 1978), Irish politician
Niamh Uí Bhriain (born 1970), Irish activist
Niamh Walsh, Irish actress
Niamh Whelan (born 1990), Irish sprinter
Niamh Wilson (born 1997), Canadian actress
Niamh Fisher-Black (born 2000), New Zealand professional racing cyclist

Neve, Neave, Neavh or Nieve 
Nieve Jennings (born 1987), Scottish model
Neve McIntosh (born 1972), Scottish actress
Neve Gayford (born 2018), daughter of Jacinda Ardern, Prime Minister of New Zealand
Neave Brown (1929-2018), American-British architect
Neve Campbell (born 1973), Canadian actress (Neve was also the maiden name of her Dutch mother)

Fictional

Characters
Niamh Cassidy in the soap opera Fair City
Niamh, wife of Slaine Mac Roth in the 2000 AD comic series Sláine
Niamh Quigley in the BBC Television programme Ballykissangel
Niamh O’Connor (character), minor character in the soap opera Emmerdale
Niamh in the book Son of the Shadows by Juliet Marillier
Niamh Cranitch in the BBC legal drama, Silk
Niamh Connolly in Channel 4 TV series Father Ted
Niamh Brodie, deceased sister of Jackson Brodie in the book Case Histories by Kate Atkinson
Niamh Fairbrother in the book The Casual Vacancy by JK Rowling
Ebba/Niamh Rose, known as Rose, main character in the book East by Edith Pattou
Niamh in the ABC2 show Please Like Me
Niamh in the movie Dark Touch
Niamh Reid in the TV3 series Red Rock
 Niamh Donoghue in the BBC 1 series Doctors
Niamh in the book The Kaiju Preservation Society by John Scalzi
Niamh O'Hare in the Irish TV series Hope Street
Professor Niamh Fitzgerald from the video game Hogwarts Legacy

Places
The Niamh Passes, a set of mountain passes located in the world of Robert Jordan's epic fantasy series The Wheel of Time

Other uses of the name
LÉ Niamh (P52), a ship in the Irish Naval Service

See also
List of Irish-language given names
Neve (disambiguation)
Nia (given name)
Nieves

References

Irish-language feminine given names